Hempstead County is a county located in the U.S. state of Arkansas. As of the 2020 census, the population was 20,065, down from 22,609 at the 2010 census.  The county seat is Hope. Hempstead County is Arkansas's fourth county, formed on December 15, 1818, alongside Clark and Pulaski counties.  The county is named for Edward Hempstead, a delegate to the U.S. Congress from the Missouri Territory, which included present-day Arkansas at the time.  It is an alcohol prohibition or dry county.

42nd United States President Bill Clinton (in office 1993-2001) was born in the county seat of Hope on August 19, 1946. Clinton is the only President to be born in Arkansas, as of 2022.

Geography
Hempstead County is alternately considered as part of the greater regions of South Arkansas or Southwest Arkansas.

Major highways

 Interstate 30
 U.S. Highway 67
 U.S. Highway 278
 U.S. Highway 371
 Highway 4
 Highway 27
 Highway 29
 Highway 32

Adjacent counties
 Pike County (north)
 Nevada County (east)
 Lafayette County (south)
 Miller County (southwest)
 Little River County (west)
 Howard County (northwest)

Demographics

2020 census

As of the 2020 United States census, there were 20,065 people, 8,094 households, and 5,711 families residing in the county.

2000 census
As of the 2000 census, there were 23,587 people, 8,959 households, and 6,378 families residing in the county. There were 10,178 housing units at an average density of 14 per square mile (5/km2). The racial makeup of the county was 63.28% White, 30.36% Black or African American, 0.42% Native American, 0.17% Asian, 0.02% Pacific Islander, 4.17% from other races, and 1.59% from two or more races.  8.25% of the population were Hispanic or Latino of any race.

There were 8,959 households, out of which 33.40% had children under the age of 18 living with them, 51.40% were married couples living together, 15.30% had a female householder with no husband present, and 28.80% were non-families. 25.50% of all households were made up of individuals, and 11.70% had someone living alone who was 65 years of age or older.  The average household size was 2.60 and the average family size was 3.09.

In the county, the population was spread out, with 27.30% under the age of 18, 9.60% from 18 to 24, 27.20% from 25 to 44, 21.70% from 45 to 64, and 14.10% who were 65 years of age or older.  The median age was 35 years. For every 100 females, there were 93.70 males.  For every 100 females age 18 and over, there were 89.70 males.

The median income for a household in the county was $28,622, and the median income for a family was $34,082. Males had a median income of $25,830 versus $17,383 for females. The per capita income for the county was $14,103.  About 16.00% of families and 20.30% of the population were below the poverty line, including 29.20% of those under age 18 and 16.70% of those age 65 or over.

Government
Starting in 2008, voters of Hempstead County have shifted to the political right in US presidential elections. That said, the city of Hope is still very Democratic as of 2023.

Communities

Cities
 Blevins
 Hope (county seat)
 Washington

Towns

 Fulton
 McNab
 McCaskill
 Oakhaven
 Ozan
 Patmos
 Perrytown

Unincorporated communities
 Clow
 DeAnn

Townships

 Bodcaw (Patmos)
 Bois d'Arc (Fulton, McNab)
 De Roan (Hope, Perrytown)
 Garland
 Mine Creek (part of Ozan)
 Noland (small part of Emmet)
 Ozan (Oakhaven, Washington, most of Ozan)
 Redland (McCaskill)
 Saline
 Spring Hill
 Wallaceburg (Blevins)
 Water Creek

See also
 List of lakes of Hempstead County, Arkansas
 National Register of Historic Places listings in Hempstead County, Arkansas

References

External links

 

 
1818 establishments in Missouri Territory
Hope micropolitan area
Populated places established in 1818